Benjamín Urdapilleta (born March 11, 1986 in Buenos Aires) is an Argentine rugby union footballer and Castres player . He has played in both the centre and the flyhalf positions. His test debut for Argentina was in 2008 when he played against South Africa in Johannesburg. He signed for the Harlequins in March 2010. During the 2016–17 season he played for Castres Olympique. In the final of the 2017–18 Top 14 season he converted two tries and scored five penalties as Castres defeated Montpellier.

Honours

Club 
 Castres
Top 14: 2017–18

References

External links
scrum.com
Itsrugby profile

1986 births
Living people
Argentine people of Basque descent
Argentine rugby union players
Argentina international rugby union players
Harlequin F.C. players
Pampas XV players
Rugby union players from Buenos Aires
Club Universitario de Buenos Aires rugby union players
Expatriate rugby union players in England
Expatriate rugby union players in France
Argentine expatriate sportspeople in England
Argentine expatriate sportspeople in France
Argentine expatriate rugby union players
Rugby union fly-halves